C. Rieger's Sons Factory, also known as Arden Manufacturing Corporation and Piser Company, is a historic factory building located in the Mott Haven section of The Bronx, New York, New York. It was built in 1906, and is a six-story building clad in yellow iron spot brick in the Romanesque Revival style.  The facade and windows are trimmed in bluestone.  It originally housed a furniture manufacturer.  It was converted for use as affordable housing during 2002–2003.

It was listed on the National Register of Historic Places in 2004.

References

Industrial buildings and structures on the National Register of Historic Places in New York City
Romanesque Revival architecture in New York City
Industrial buildings completed in 1906
National Register of Historic Places in the Bronx
Mott Haven, Bronx
Residential buildings in the Bronx
1906 establishments in New York City